Charles Merton Merrill (December 11, 1907 – March 29, 1996) was a United States circuit judge of the United States Court of Appeals for the Ninth Circuit.

Education and career

Born in Honolulu, Territory of Hawaii, Merrill received an Artium Baccalaureus degree from the University of California, Berkeley in 1928 and a Bachelor of Laws from Harvard Law School in 1931. He was in private practice in Reno, Nevada from 1931 to 1950. He became a justice of the Nevada Supreme Court from 1951 to 1959, serving as chief justice from 1955 to 1956, and in 1959.

Federal judicial service

On August 27, 1959, Merrill was nominated by President Dwight D. Eisenhower to a seat on the United States Court of Appeals for the Ninth Circuit vacated by Judge William Healy. Merrill was confirmed by the United States Senate on September 14, 1959, and received his commission on September 21, 1959. He assumed senior status on October 8, 1974, serving in that capacity until his death on March 29, 1996, in San Francisco, California.

References

Sources
 

1907 births
1996 deaths
University of California, Berkeley alumni
Harvard Law School alumni
Justices of the Nevada Supreme Court
Judges of the United States Court of Appeals for the Ninth Circuit
United States court of appeals judges appointed by Dwight D. Eisenhower
20th-century American judges
Chief Justices of the Nevada Supreme Court